Ismailabad may refer to:
İsmayılabad, Azerbaijan
Esmailabad (disambiguation), places in Iran